Schöner Wohnen (German: Better Dwelling) is a German language interior design magazine which was launched in 1960 by Gruner + Jahr.

History and profile
Schöner Wohnen was established in 1960 by the Hamburg-based publishing company Gruner + Jahr. Its founding editor-in-chief was Josef Kremerkothen. The magazine enjoyed high levels of readership after its start. It has published photographs of the latest trends in furniture design, color palettes and room arrangements. Later its coverage was expanded to feature articles about architecture, lifestyle, gardening and travel. The magazine is the first German publication which employed the term design classic in 1974.

References

External links

1960 establishments in West Germany
Design magazines
German-language magazines
Lifestyle magazines
Magazines established in 1960
Magazines published in Hamburg
Women's magazines published in Germany